The Exeter Falcons were a  speedway team based in the city of Exeter. The Falcons operated from 1947 to 2005 at the County Ground Stadium in Exeter.

History

In 1947, the Falcons competed in a league for the first time when they finished fourth during the 1947 Speedway National League Division Three. The following season they won the 1948 Speedway National League Division Three. The next success came in 1951 when the club won the Division 3 National Trophy.

After a five year absence the team returned to league action in the 1961 Provincial Speedway League and the following year won the 1962 Provincial League Knockout Cup.

In 1973, the club signed New Zealander Ivan Mauger, a multiple world champion who would lead the club from 1973 to 1977 and bring Exeter their greatest success to date, when winning the 1974 British League title. In 1995 and 1996, the club ran a junior side called the Devon Demons. The Demons reappeared in 2014 as the junior side for the Plymouth Gladiators.

The Exeter Falcons then had a long wait for silverware and it was not until 2000 that Exeter won the Division 2 title during the 2000 Premier League speedway season.

Track
The County Ground track was unique in as much that it had a solid sheet metal safety fence. The fence combined with the high speeds down the narrow track made the track unpopular with many riders, but riders who liked it thrived on it. The club were forced to close at the end of 2005 after the stadium owners, Exeter Rugby Union club, sold the stadium to developers. The  track record time of 64.3 seconds was set by Mark Loram on 29 April 1996. 

Speedway promoter Allen Trump received permission from Teignbridge council officials in 2008 to construct a new track at the Exeter Racecourse, Haldon. The new track was expected to open for the start of the 2009 speedway season, and Trump had applied to the British Speedway Promoters' Association for permission to enter a team for the 2009 Premier League. However, the plans fell through.

Season summary (1st team)

Season summary (juniors)

2015 to 2021
At a public meeting in July 2015, a month after the team participated in their first full 15-heat meet in a decade, the Exeter Falcons announced talks were underway about the development of a new track near Exeter. In January 2016 the team reported clearing the first hurdles towards this goal, passing noise tests at the site, and are preparing their planning application to submit to the council. 

In 2018, an Exeter team participated in the junior league called the Southern Development League but were once again left without a home in 2021, following the closure of speedway at Somerset Rebels.

Notable Exeter riders

References

External links
The County Ground years 

Defunct British speedway teams
Sport in Exeter